tuKola is a cola brand produced and marketed in Cuba by Los Portales S.A., a joint venture with Nestlé Group.

Product lines
tuKola was produced at Los Portales' facility in Guane, Pinar del Río Province, until the 1980s. Production was then taken over by Empresa de Bebidas y Licores de Pinar del Río.

The cola is sold in 355 ml cans, 330 ml bottles, and 1.5 liter plastic bottles.

Awards
 2002 Expocaribe Award – tuKola Dietética
 2001 XIX Fihav Award – tuKola Dietética

See also
Soft drink
OpenCola
Ciego Montero

References

External links

Cola brands
Cuban brands
Drink companies of Cuba